The State Treasurer of Kansas is the chief custodian of Kansas’s cash deposits, monies from bond sales, and other securities and collateral and directs the investments of those assets. The Treasurer provides for the safe and efficient operation of state government through effective banking, investment, and cash management.

The treasurer oversees an office that currently handles over $20 billion and an annual operating budget of $3.5 million. Key programs in the office are Bonds Services, Cash Management, Unclaimed Property, the Ag Loan and Housing Loan Deposit Programs and the Kansas 529 Education Savings Program, which has more than 143,000 accounts with total assets of over $2.7 billion. The Treasurer's office is a fee-funded agency. The treasurer also serves as a member of the Kansas Public Employee's Retirement System (KPERS) and the Pooled Money Investment Board.

Divisions
Administration
Bond Services
Cash Management
Kansas Learning Quest
Unclaimed Property

Office holders

Territorial Treasurers

State Treasurers

References

External links

1861 establishments in Kansas